Ché Walker is an English actor, playwright, theatre director, and teacher. His musical Been So Long played at the Edinburgh Festival Fringe and the Young Vic theatre. It was later developed into a feature film of the same name starring Michaela Coel and released by Netflix in 2018.

As an actor, he has appeared on television, with credits including The Office and EastEnders. His mother is the actress Ann Mitchell. Walker lives in Camden in London.

Accolades
 2003 George Devine Award
 2003 Arts Council Young Writers Award, for Flesh Wound

List of works

Writing credits 
 Been So Long, Royal Court Theatre, London, 1998; Young Vic Theatre, London, 2009
Jack and the Beanstalk, Lyric Theatre Hammersmith, London, 2009
 translation of Sophocles' Iphigenia, Southwark Playhouse
 Flesh Wound, Royal Court Theatre Upstairs, London,
 Crazy Love, Glasgow: Oran Mor, Scotland, 2007
 Dance for Me, Webber Douglas, 2004
 A Passion for Mayhem
 Greenskin Gal
 Inner City Magic
 Translation of Akos Nemeth's Car Thieves, Cottesloe Theatre, National Theatre, London, 2004
 The Frontline, Globe, London, 2008 
 The Lightning Child, Globe, London, 2013
Been So Long, film screenplay, 2018

Directing credits 
 Etta Jenks (Finborough Theatre)
 Achidi J's Final Hours (Finborough Theatre)
 Rootz Spectacula (Belgrade Theatre, Coventry)
 Macbeth (Southwark Playhouse)
 The Glory of Living (Battersea Arts Centre)
 Balm in Gilead (RADA)
 A Mouthful of Birds (RADA)
 A Prayer for Owen Meany (Corbett Theatre)
 A Flea in Her Ear (Corbett Theatre)
 The Hot L Baltimore (Corbett Theatre)
 The Time Of Our Lies (Park Theatre)

Acting credits 
 Othello (Shakespeare's Globe)
 The Pitchfork Disney (Citizens Theatre)
 Old Rose (Citizens Theatre)
 Sunshine (Southwark Playhouse)
 Biloxi Blues (Salisbury Playhouse)
 Wait Until Dark (Plymouth Theatre Royal)
 Danny and the Deep Blue Sea (Interchange Studios)

References

External links
Ché Walker's official website
"Interview: Ché Walker", Music OMH, Natasha Tripney, 6/2008
"INTERVIEW: CHE WALKER", Theatre Voice

English male stage actors
English theatre directors
English dramatists and playwrights
Living people
English male dramatists and playwrights
Translators of Ancient Greek texts
Year of birth missing (living people)